Women's Coalition of Milwaukee operated from 1972 to 1987 in Milwaukee, Wisconsin and was founded by individual members of Milwaukee's local National Organization for Women chapter. The Women's Coalition proposed to "serve as an advocate for women; to interpret to the community at large the special concerns and problems of women." The first original bylaws of this feminist organization is "To form a coalition of feminist groups ... to combat sex discrimination ... to provide assistance to new feminist groups and create alternative institutions within the women's movement ... to educate women regarding their legal rights, vocational possibilities and personal health ... to serve as an advocate for women; to interpret to the community at large the special concerns and problems of women."

Important Dates
 October 1972 - Doors open for Women's Coalition of Milwaukee at 2211 E Kenwood Boulevard
 January 1973 - The Women's Crisis Line begins formal operations 
 October 1973 - Attorney L. Mandy Stellman created the Articles of Incorporation which allowed the organization to become a non-profit corporate entity
 1974 - Received its first substantial funding outside of small donations
 1975- Task Force on Battered Women is established
 May 1975 - The Women's Crisis Line independently becomes the Women's Crisis Line, Inc.
 October 2 & 3, 1976- Wisconsin Conference on Battered Women
 November 1976- The Task Force on Battered Women takes initial steps to become independent and moves to West Fond du Lac Avenue
 July 1978- Doors open for Sojourner Truth House
 1979- The Task Force on Battered Women becomes fully independent and relocates to Mitchell Street
 1979- The Women's Crisis Line, Inc. is sponsored with the Counseling Center of Milwaukee
 1981- Sojourner Truth House is expanded
 1986- The Women's Crisis Line, Inc. becomes affiliated with the Women's Health Institute at Good Samaritan Medical Center

Getting Started 
Individual members of Milwaukee's NOW chapter including Sharon Senese, Judy Anderson, Carolyn Mueller, Ellen Guiseppi, and Susan Luecke are considered the Coalition's "founding mothers" and kick started the organization. Surviving on only volunteers and donations, the Coalition sponsored workshops on self-defense, legal rights, women's history, health issues, childcare, feminism, assertiveness training, and consciousness raising. After gaining momentum and publicity, the Women's Coalition of Milwaukee received its first substantial funding outside of small donations. They received a $1,000 grant from the Catholic Campaign for Human Development and a $500 grant from the United Church of Christ for educational purposes. The IBM Corporation donated printing equipment worth $1,700 and, in the largest contribution to date, United Community Services bestowed a $3,200 grant on the Coalition to develop further programming. These forms of funding allowed the Coalition to hire its first paid staff positions in 1974.

Projects

Women's Crisis Line 
The first project of the Women's Coalition of Milwaukee, still running today at Milwaukee's Good Samaritan Medical Center, was started to provide people with help that was not being given by other existing social services and was set up as a feminist institution. Approximately thirty volunteers served at all times to cover alternate four-hour shifts and all workers at the Women's Crisis Line were women. This was because the center was created for women and was therefore run by women; additionally these women could relate to the other women in need. The information provided by the callers and workers was used to identify where there was help needed in the community which then led to the formation of the Sexual Assault Counseling Unit, the Sexual Assault Treatment Center, and the Task Force on Battered Women. The crisis line was a successful first project for the Coalition because the Coalition bylaws strived "to develop alternative institutions within the women's movement." The center, being a feminist institution, also adapted a feminist philosophy as The Crisis Line's policy statement stated, "No matter what your personal views, when counseling, you should suggest all the alternatives to a particular woman's problem (non-sexist, of course) and leave the final decision up to her ... As women, we feel this society treats us with disrespect, treats us as if we are sick or crazy because we do not fit the mold they have made for us ... Women in this country for too long have had other people (men) make their decisions, and we will at no time perpetuate this ..." The Women's Crisis Line was not only helpful, it was successful. "In its first month of operation, the Crisis Line received 119 calls, and one year later, in January 1974, the monthly total reached  755. By mid-1977, the Crisis Line reported that the number of calls received each month averaged between 1,200 and 1,500. The major areas of concern expressed by callers included relationships, family conflicts, divorce, depression, legal issues, and pregnancy and other health concerns. Many callers sought referrals to local professional and social service providers knowing that Crisis Line staff made referrals only to those individuals and services with an established record of fair and sensitive treatment of women. Sexual assault accounted for 30–35 calls per month, and potential suicides constituted 10 calls each month."
Due to gaining of momentum, idea of the Women's Crisis Line to go independent and break off from the Women's Coalition of Milwaukee stemmed from Crisis Line Director Karen Coy. The group wanted to become independent mainly because of financial reasons though not all members were in favor of the split. In May 1975 it became an independent organization but remained in close communication with the Women's Coalition of Milwaukee by continuing to work with them on other projects in the Milwaukee area. Though split, the Women's Coalition of Milwaukee is often referred to as the independent organization's 'mother' agency. The organization then transferred to the Counseling Center of Milwaukee as they found sponsorship in 1979 and later became affiliated with the Women's Health Institute at Good Samaritan Medical Center in 1986.

The Women's Crisis Line not only helped the community, it also raised awareness which started other programs as a result. One of the programs that was created through the crisis line was the Sexual Assault Counseling Unit in the Milwaukee County District Attorney's Office. Previously, there had been cases of officers of the Milwaukee Police Department being insensitive and even discriminatory when approaching cases of sexual assault. The tipping point of the Coalition was when Sharon Senese observed a police officer approach a victim of sexual assault saying "If women want to prevent rape, they should keep their legs crossed... How many rapes do you really think are rapes?". The Anti-Rape Council was then formed because of the initial efforts of Sharon Senese which influenced members of the Crisis Line, Coalition, NOW, League of Women Voters, YWCA, and other women's groups to join in her efforts. The creation of the Anti-Rape Council further increased the awareness of sexual assault and other crimes that were previously ignored which resulted in more legal action taking place. With this raised awareness the Sexual Assault Treatment Center of Greater Milwaukee was created independently in 1976.

Task Force on Battered Women 
Initially started by Nova Clite and Virginia Ray, the information collected by the Women's Crisis Line indicated that there was a clear need for a place to help women that encountered violent abuse. Usually brought on by the victim's spouse, the Coalition felt as though there was not nearly enough awareness of this problem and that victims of domestic abuse did not have a safe place to go. The Women's Coalition of Milwaukee then started the Task Force on Battered Women in 1975 in order to provide counseling, shelter, advocacy, and other services for battered women and their children. The Coalition tried to focus on why this issue was so prevalent in the community and why women were primarily affected. They came to the conclusion that "woman battering was seen as a manifestation of the imbalance of power relations between the sexes, as an overt, physical expression of the subjection of women. Task Force members believed only an overall transformation of society in which men shed their dominant role and attitudes and women were accorded equal treatment and respect could ultimately redress this social problem. While feminists at the Coalition used educational and agitational methods to work toward the long-term goal of social change, they realized that immediate relief and social services were necessities for battered women in Milwaukee". The Task Force gained momentum in 1976 when donations were gathered to increase its budget to $13,000. This increase in budget lead to increased training for counseling workers and helped to create the first Wisconsin Conference on Battered Women that featured feminist writer Lisa Leghorn at the Milwaukee YWCA on October 2 and 3, 1976.

Similar to the Women's Crisis Line, the Task Force on Battered Women also sought independence from the Women's Coalition of Milwaukee in November 1976 and moved location to West Fond du Lac Avenue. Official independence followed through for the Task Force on Battered Women in 1979 and relocated again to Mitchell Street. The organization continued to thrive after cutting ties from the Women's Coalition of Milwaukee and even influenced other organizations to form such as the Sojourner Truth House and other shelters for victims of family violence in the Milwaukee area.

Sojourner Truth House 
Initially created as an immediate escape for women in potentially dangerous situations, Sojourner Truth House was created as a result of Rosemary Caravella's previous efforts. She had started an unofficial setup of homes in the Milwaukee area that served as a safe space for victims but could not provide enough care for these people as a shelter would. This fueled the creation of the Sojourner Truth House. Though eventually prosperous, the project was not fully supported for nearly three.years. "The new contacts with lawyers, politicians, and social service personnel facilitated what was, nevertheless, a laborious process. The labyrinthine negotiations with contractors, insurers, city zoning and building authorities, lawyers, bankers, funders, and neighborhood associations took almost three years. Family Hospital finally leased a building to the Task Force for a minimal sum and localfoundations, along with United Way and federal Housing and Urban Development grants, supported the new shelter." The first facility opened its doors July 1978 and contained enough room for 18 women and children and later expanded in 1981 with enough room for 32 women and children. The efforts of Sojourner Truth House also influenced other organizations within the community, "after Sojourner Truth House opened, two other shelters (not directly affiliated with the Task Force) were established in the Milwaukee area, the Milwaukee Women's Refuge and Waukesha's Sister House. In addition, three major hospitals, Children's, Northwest General, and Good Samaritan, responding to the need first identified by feminists, developed special units for the treatment of domestic abuse and child abuse victims". The shelter originally started by the Women's Coalition of Milwaukee aimed to help victims of family abuse and stimulated the community by raising awareness for people in these situations. "In 1987, the Task Force on Battered Women continues to offer counseling, support groups, and referrals for battered women in Milwaukee. The total number of individuals aided has risen steadily each year since the Task Force began. In 1976, approximately 400 received aid. According to Task Force Co-Director Connie Corrao, by 1983, the yearly total of clients jumped to 6,000, and during 1986, the Task Force aided a total of 10,700 battered women and their children. Corrao noted that the dramatic increase does not necessarily mean the problem of woman battering is becoming more widespread. Rather, the increase is due largely to successful community education  efforts which familiarized battery victims with the many new support services available." This extremely charitable organization is remains up and running today and still thrives in the Milwaukee area. Find out more information at: http://www.sojournertruthhouse.org/

References 

History of Milwaukee
National Organization for Women
History of women in Wisconsin